Charles Mills (born 1816) was an English cricketer.

Mills made one first-class appearance for Kent in September 1840. In the single match in which he played, Kent made what was at the time their third-lowest first-class total. Mills made just four runs in the match, scoring two in each innings.

References

1816 births
English cricketers
Kent cricketers
Year of death missing